Essam Mahmoud (born 20 June 1977) is an Egyptian retired professional football goalkeeper. He is currently the goalkeeper coach of Tersana SC.

Career
At the club level, Mahmoud plays for El Gouna of Hurghada in the Egyptian Premier League.

He was also selected as a reserve goalkeeper for the Egypt national football team at the 2004 African Cup of Nations. However, he did not appear in any matches.

Coaching career
After retiring at the end of the 2013-14 season, Mahmoud began as a goalkeeper coach, starting for the youth teams of ENPPI Club. He left the club in October 2016, he left the club and was hired by Tersana SC. He left the club in January 2017.

Ahead of the 2017-18 season, he was hired by Wadi Degla FC, still as a goalkeeper coach. However, he returned to Tersana SC in the summer 2019.

Honours
ENPPI
Egypt Cup: 2005

References

1977 births
Living people
Association football goalkeepers
Egyptian footballers
2004 African Cup of Nations players
ENPPI SC players
Al Ittihad Alexandria Club players
El Gouna FC players
Wadi Degla SC players
Lierse S.K. players
El Entag El Harby SC players
Belgian Pro League players
Expatriate footballers in Belgium
Egyptian expatriates in Belgium